The Commonwealth Court of Pennsylvania is one of Pennsylvania's two intermediate appellate courts. The Commonwealth Court's headquarters is in Harrisburg, Pennsylvania, with jurisdiction over administrative and civil public law. The  Superior Court of Pennsylvania is the other intermediate appellate court in the Pennsylvania Unified Judicial System, having jurisdiction over criminal and private civil cases.

The jurisdiction of the nine-judge Commonwealth Court is limited to appeals from final orders of certain state agencies and certain designated cases from the Courts of Common Pleas involving public sector legal questions and government regulation. The Commonwealth Court also functions as a trial court in some civil actions by or against the Commonwealth government and cases regarding statewide elections (42 Pa.C.S. §§ 761–764).

Article V, section 4 of the 1968 Pennsylvania Constitution created the Commonwealth Court. Acts enacted in 1970 set up the court.  Judges are elected to 10-year terms, and must retire at the age of 75.

The Commonwealth Court publishes its precedential opinions in the Atlantic Reporter 3d series.  From 1970 to 1995, the court maintained an official reporter, Pennsylvania Commonwealth Court Reports, volumes 1–168 (1970–1995). The Court's precedential and non-precedential ("unreported") opinions are posted online.

Appeals from Commonwealth Court decisions go to the Supreme Court of Pennsylvania.

Judges

Vacancies and pending nominations

Senior judges

See also

References

External links
Commonwealth Court of Pennsylvania
Opinions of the Court

1970 establishments in Pennsylvania
Administrative courts
Pennsylvania state courts
Pennsylvania
Courts and tribunals established in 1970
Commonwealth Court of Pennsylvania